Österreich (literally Austria) is a national Austrian daily newspaper, based in Vienna.

History and profile
Österreich, a German language newspaper, was first published in Vienna by Helmut and Wolfgang Fellner on 1 September 2006. Wolfgang Fellner, the owner, publisher and editor of the daily, also launched other Austrian publications, including NEWS magazine. Mediengruppe Österreich GmbH is the owner of the daily.

Österreich is published in tabloid format and is described as a magazine-like paper. The paper is like USA Today in terms of its editorial design. In weekends, the paper provides three supplements, TV and people, lifestyle, and a regional supplement. The daily targets the young adults from 18 to 35.

The 2006 circulation of Österreich was 159,306 copies. In the period of 2007-2008 the daily had the readership of 9.34%. Its circulation for the first half of 2007 was 120,510 copies whereas for the same period in 2008 it was 129,680
copies. In 2010, the paper had a circulation of 410,000 copies.

On 16 August 2016 Österreich told the press that they would start a 24h-News-Television-Channel, in cooperation with CNN, on 22 September 2016. The TV-Channel is called oe24TV of which the Logo of would be very similar to the logo of the internet portal oe24 of the newspaper.

See also
 List of newspapers in Austria

References

External links

2006 establishments in Austria
Daily newspapers published in Austria
German-language newspapers published in Austria
Newspapers published in Vienna
Publications established in 2006
Television stations in Austria